Jamie Toledo Olivo (born 23 April 1989) is a Mexican professional footballer who plays as a midfielder for Madera Santos, in the Madera Premier League.

Toledo began his playing career in the Santos Laguna youth teams in 2007. He managed to break into the first team on October 12, 2008, during a 2–0 loss to CF Pachuca.

He has also played in the CONCACAF Champions League for Santos, playing in 4 games.

External links
 
 
 

1989 births
Living people
Mexican footballers
Association football midfielders
Santos Laguna footballers
C.D. Veracruz footballers
Liga MX players
Ascenso MX players
Footballers from Sinaloa
People from Escuinapa de Hidalgo